Vivienne Roche (born 1953) is an Irish sculptor and art critic.

Biography 
Born in Cork in 1953, daughter of an engineer, Roche was educated in Miss O'Sullivan's primary and secondary school before studying first at the Crawford School of Art from 1970 to 1974 and then the School of the Museum of Fine Arts in Boston graduating in 1975. She was awarded an honorary doctorate by University College Cork in 2006.

She began her creative life as an artist but moved into sculptor and is considered one of Ireland's foremost sculptors. Roche was one of the founders of the National Sculpture Factory in Cork and was the chair from 1989 to 1997. She also was on the national Arts Council from 1993 to -1998 as well as on the governing body of Cork Institute of Technology. She is a member of Aosdána and the Royal Hibernian Academy. She is on the board of the Hugh Lane Gallery and the Dublin City Gallery. Roche remains active in creating national cultural policy.

Roche has participated in exhibitions in multiple countries like France, Finland, Sweden, England, and the U.S. Her work has been presented by the President of Ireland to other national heads of state. She lives in Co. Cork.

References

1953 births
Living people
Irish women sculptors
Alumni of Cork Institute of Technology
People from Cork (city)
20th-century Irish women artists
21st-century Irish women artists